Thornton Beach is a coastal town and locality in the Shire of Douglas, Queensland, Australia.

Geography 
Thornton Beach is bounded to the south by the Cape Tribulation Road and to the east by the Coral Sea. The wide, flat beach has a tide which, at its highest point, almost reached the trees. Most of the southern and western parts of the locality are within the Daintree National Park. Cape Tribulation Road connects from Diwan to the south through to Cape Tribulation to the north and passes through the town.

History 
Thornton Beach was named as a town on 1 February 1972.

On 29 May 2016, a 46-year-old woman visiting from New South Wales was attacked by a crocodile while swimming at the beach with her friend, who attempted unsuccessfully to rescue her before she was taken. Police conducted a search of the coastline and surrounding estuaries, and the woman was later confirmed to be dead. The attack sparked conversations of crocodile population culling in the area, initiated by federal MP Bob Katter.

References 

Towns in Queensland
Shire of Douglas
Coastline of Queensland
Localities in Queensland